Fighting with My Family is a 2019 biographical sports comedy-drama film written and directed by Stephen Merchant. Based on the 2012 documentary The Wrestlers: Fighting with My Family by Max Fisher, it depicts the career of English professional wrestler Paige as she makes her way to WWE, while also following her brother Zak Zodiac, as he struggles with his failure to achieve similar success. Florence Pugh and Jack Lowden star as Paige and Zodiac respectively, alongside Lena Headey, Nick Frost, Vince Vaughn, and Dwayne Johnson, with the latter also acting as producer.

The film premiered at the Sundance Film Festival on 28 January 2019, and was theatrically released in the United States on 14 February 2019. It received positive reviews from critics, particularly for the performances of Pugh and Vaughn. The film grossed $41.5 million worldwide.

Plot
Wrestlers Rick and Julia Knight raise their children, Saraya and Zak, to follow in their footsteps; as young adults, the siblings apply to join the WWE, and are evaluated by veteran trainer Hutch Morgan, who agrees to let them try out before a SmackDown taping at The O2 Arena, where they meet WWE legend Dwayne "The Rock" Johnson. Shortly before her tryout, Saraya adopts the stage name "Paige".

Morgan chooses Paige to train for the WWE, but not Zak, despite Paige's protests. Morgan forces Zak to return home after making it clear he will never be signed to the WWE, leaving Paige with no one to stick up for her. Arriving at NXT in Florida, Paige has difficulty with the training, especially given that her fellow trainees are mostly models and cheerleaders who have no wrestling experience and thus make poor opponents. Paige also struggles with performing choreographed promos as they clash with her own natural instincts, and suffers from Morgan's constant belittlement of her mistakes. 

During her WWE debut at an NXT live event, Paige is heckled by the crowd and freezes, leaving the ring in tears. She tries bleaching her dark hair and gets a spray tan in a desperate attempt to fit in with her peers. After failing an obstacle course, Paige lashes out at the other trainees for gossiping about her when they weren't. A sympathetic Morgan then reveals to Paige the real reason he didn't let Zak sign up: the league would have forced him to work as a jobber, which would have ruined his health. Morgan implies that a similar experience forced him to give up on his own wrestling career.

Believing that professional wrestling isn't worth it and that she'd have a much happier life helping her parents train other wrestlers, Paige decides to quit the WWE and return to her hometown. She travels home for the Christmas break to inform her family of her decision. Angry that she is giving up on the dream that he failed to achieve, Zak attacks Paige during a wrestling match, then gets in a drunken bar fight. Paige changes her mind after Zak berates her  for giving up, and she returns to Florida to rejoin the WWE. She reasserts her individuality by re-adopting her original hair color and skin tone, rapidly improves in training, and befriends and encourages many of her fellow trainees.

Morgan brings the trainees to WrestleMania XXX, where The Rock greets Paige and tells her she will make her Raw debut the following night against the current WWE Divas Champion, AJ Lee. Paige makes her Raw debut, where she again freezes, and takes a severe beating from Lee before finally turning the tables and beating the champion. Claiming Lee's title for herself, she proudly declares that "this is MY house now!" as her family and friends cheer her victory back home.

Cast
 Florence Pugh as Saraya "Paige" Bevis, Zak's little sister and Patrick and Julia's daughter. Her stunts during wrestling scenes were performed by Tessa Blanchard.
 Tori Ellen Ross as young Paige
 Lena Headey as Julia "Sweet Saraya Knight" Hamer, Paige and Zak's mother and Patrick's wife.
 Nick Frost as Patrick "Rowdy Ricky Knight" Bevis, Paige and Zak's father and Julia's husband.
 Jack Lowden as Zak "Zodiac Knight" Bevis, Paige's older brother and Patrick and Julia's son.
 Vince Vaughn as Hutch Morgan, a recruiter and coach for the WWE.
 Dwayne Johnson as himself/The Rock
 James Burrows as Roy Knight, Patrick's son, Julia's stepson and Zak and Paige's older half-brother.
 Hannah Rae as Courtney, Zak's girlfriend and mother of his son, Caden.
 Thea Trinidad as April Jeanette "AJ Lee" Mendez
 Kim Matula as Jeri-Lynn
 Aqueela Zoll as Kirsten
 Ellie Gonsalves as Maddison
 Elroy Powell as Union Jack
 Jack Gouldbourne as Calum
 Stephen Merchant as Hugh, Courtney's father.
 Julia Davis as Daphne, Courtney's mother.

Additionally, WWE wrestlers Big Show, Sheamus and The Miz make appearances as themselves, while an uncredited actor played John Cena. Michael Cole, Jerry Lawler, and John Layfield provide commentary on the Paige vs. AJ Lee match. Several other WWE wrestlers (including Cena himself), as well as the real Knight family, appear in archival footage throughout the film, while Zak Zodiac himself appears in a cameo as a gang lieutenant.

Production
On 7 February 2017, The Hollywood Reporter reported that Dwayne Johnson and Stephen Merchant had teamed with WWE Studios and Film4 to produce a film based on the life of Saraya "Paige" Bevis, a professional wrestler with the WWE. Merchant would write and direct the film, while Johnson would cameo in the film and executive produce. In the days after the announcement, the main cast was revealed: Florence Pugh as Saraya, Jack Lowden as Saraya's brother Zak, and Lena Headey and Nick Frost as their parents. Metro-Goldwyn-Mayer acquired the distribution rights on 10 February for US$17.5 million. On 14 February, Johnson announced that Vince Vaughn had been cast, and filming would commence the following day. In-ring scenes were filmed after WWE Raw on 20 February at the Staples Center in Los Angeles. Filming also took place around Bracknell, Berkshire, specifically the Harmans Water area, also in and around Norwich, Norfolk, England, with locations around the city used in the film, as well as the seaside town of Great Yarmouth, and at Pinewood Studios.

Historical accuracy
Like many biographical films, the film took several liberties with Paige's journey with WWE. The film had her start her WWE career performing for NXT when she actually first performed in Florida Championship Wrestling, Paige's time in NXT was kept minimal with no mention of her reign as NXT Women's Champion, and several characters were fictional, including Hutch Morgan. Additionally, Paige had previously failed a WWE tryout before being successful in another. Johnson himself never met Paige (or any of the Bevis/Knight family) until seeing the original documentary in 2012, unlike the film's fictionalized portrayal of Johnson meeting Paige and Zak backstage of a WWE event in England; Johnson himself had just returned to WWE in 2011 after a seven-year absence when Paige signed with WWE in April 2011.

Release 
Fighting with My Family premiered at the 2019 Sundance Film Festival on 28 January. It was released in the United States on 14 February 2019, in four theatres in Los Angeles and New York, and expanded to a wide release on 22 February 2019. It was released on 27 February 2019 in the United Kingdom.

Reception

Box office

In its limited opening weekend, Fighting with My Family made $162,567 from four theaters over the four-day President's Day weekend. The film expanded to 2,711 theaters the following weekend and made $2.6 million on its first Friday wide, including $450,000 from Thursday night previews, and went on to gross $8 million for the weekend, finishing fourth at the box office. In its second weekend of wide release, the film made $4.7 million, dropping 40% and finishing seventh.

Critical response
The website's critical consensus reads, "Much like the sport it celebrates, Fighting with My Family muscles past clichés with a potent blend of energy and committed acting that should leave audiences cheering." On Metacritic, the film has a weighted average score of 68 out of 100, based on 38 critics, indicating "generally favorable reviews." Audiences polled by CinemaScore gave the film an average grade of "A−" on an A+ to F scale, while those at PostTrak gave it an overall positive score of 83% and a 57% "definite recommend."

Nick Allen of RogerEbert.com opined in a three-out-of-four star review: "Even though Fighting with My Family is undoubtedly about branding the WWE as a fantasy factory, its biggest strengths are its wit and surprisingly big heart."

References

External links
 

2019 films
2010s sports comedy-drama films
American coming-of-age comedy-drama films
American films based on actual events
American sports comedy-drama films
British coming-of-age comedy-drama films
British films based on actual events
British sports comedy-drama films
Cultural depictions of professional wrestlers
2010s English-language films
Films about alcoholism
Films about families
Films produced by Dwayne Johnson
Films set in 2002
Films set in 2011
Films set in 2012
Films set in 2014
Films set in London
Films set in New Orleans
Films set in Norfolk
Films set in Orlando, Florida
Films shot in Los Angeles
Films shot in Norfolk
Metro-Goldwyn-Mayer films
Seven Bucks Productions films
Sports films based on actual events
Women in WWE
Women's professional wrestling films
WWE Studios films
Films shot at Pinewood Studios
2010s American films
2010s British films